Cary is a historic barony in County Antrim, Northern Ireland. To its north is the north-Antrim coast, and it is bordered by three other baronies: Dunluce Lower to the west; Dunluce Upper to the south; and Glenarm Lower to the south-east. The Giant's Causeway is situated on the north coast of Cary. Dunineny Castle lies in the civil parish of Ramoan within this barony.

The barony is named after the Cothrugu (Cotraigib, Crotraigib), an ancient tribe.

Geographical features
The geographical features of Cary include:
Giant's Causeway
Carneighaneigh and Knocklayd mountains
Glenshesk valley
The bays of Marketon (Margietown), Whitepark Bay, Cooraghy, and Murlough Bay
Doon, Lacada, and the Giant's Causeway points
The islands of Carrickarede and Rathlin Island
Loughaveema and Lough Doo
The promontories of Bengore Head, Benbane Head, Fair Head, Torr Head, and Runabay Head

List of settlements
Below is a list of settlements in Cary:

Towns
Ballycastle

List of civil parishes
Below is a list of civil parishes in Cary:
Armoy (split with barony of Dunluce Upper)
Ballintoy
Billy (split with barony of Dunluce Lower)
Culfeightrin
Grange of Drumtullagh
Ramoan
Rathlin Island

See also
List of baronies of Northern Ireland

References